Robert Colin Laidlaw (16 September 1896 – 25 January 1985) was an Australian rules footballer who played with Essendon and Footscray in the Victorian Football League (VFL).

Notes

External links 
		
Col Laidlaw's profile at Australianfootball.com

1896 births
1985 deaths
Australian rules footballers from Melbourne
Essendon Football Club players
Footscray Football Club (VFA) players
Western Bulldogs players
People from Kensington, Victoria